Madhya Pradesh State Highway 26 (MP SH 26) is a State Highway running from Khategaon till Amarkantak. It is popularly known as Jabalpur Road.

It passes through the width of the entire state via Balaghat, Seoni, Chhindwara, Multai, Betul, Khandwa, Khargone, Barwani, Kukshi and Alirajpur.

See also
List of state highways in Madhya Pradesh

References

State Highways in Madhya Pradesh